Siberian means pertaining to Siberia.

Siberian may also refer to:
Siberians, demonym for residents of Siberia, as well as the Russian sub-ethnic group
Siberian (cat), cat breed
Paleo-Indians
Tungusic peoples

See also
Siberia (disambiguation)
Sibiryak (disambiguation)